The men's triple jump event at the 2003 IAAF World Indoor Championships was held on March 16.

Results

References
Results

Triple
Triple jump at the World Athletics Indoor Championships